Charles Tennyson may refer to:
 Charles Tennyson d'Eyncourt (1784–1861), British politician, uncle of the poet Lord Tennyson
 Charles Tennyson Turner (1808–1879), his nephew and brother of the poet Lord Tennyson
 Charles Tennyson (civil servant) (1879–1977), grandson of the poet Lord Tennyson, British civil servant and industrialist
 Charles Julian Tennyson (1915–1945), his son and great-grandson of the poet Lord Tennyson, English writer and historian
 Charles Jonathan Tennyson (physicist) (born 1955), his nephew and great-great-grandson of the poet Lord Tennyson, British physicist